{{Automatic taxobox
| fossil_range = Late Oligocene - Late Pleistocene, 
| image = Quinkana timara skull.jpg
| image_caption = Restoration of the skull of Q. timara at the Central Australian Museum| taxon = Quinkana
| authority = Molnar, 1981
| subdivision_ranks = Species
| subdivision = * Quinkana fortirostrum Molnar, 1981 (type)
 Quinkana timara Megirian, 1994
 Quinkana babarra Willis & Mackness, 1996
 Quinkana meboldi Willis, 1997
}}Quinkana is an extinct genus of mekosuchine crocodylians that lived in Australia from about 28 million to about 10,000 years ago. Most attributed specimens have been found in Queensland. It is speculated to have been one of the top predators of Pleistocene Australia, along with megalania, the giant monitor lizard, and the modern saltwater crocodile.

The genus and type species, Q. fortirostrum was named by paleontologist Ralph E. Molnar in 1981. Other species in the genus are Q. timara (1994), Q. babarra (1996), and Q. meboldi (1997). The name Quinkana comes from the "Quinkans", a legendary folk spirit from Gugu-Yalanji mythology.Quinkana is thought to possess long legs and had ziphodont teeth (lateromedially compressed, recurved, and serrated). The genus is distinguishable by the combination of these ziphodont teeth and a broad snout. It also has a unique alveolar (tooth socket) structure and a short anterior palatine process (upper mouth bone). However, these estimates are based on fragmentary specimens and dimensions of related genera as there have been no complete Quinkana specimens found.Quinkana was originally attributed to family Crocodylidae in 1981 without a further classification because of its unique physical characteristics. Some of its particular morphological traits shared by other Australian crocodile genera were entirely unique (primarily dentary and snout formations) which led to the creation of the subfamily Mekosuchinae in 1993 to accommodate it.

The genus has been argued amongst paleontologists to be entirely terrestrial or semi-aquatic with no definitive consensus. Academic analysis cites comparative morphologies as indicators of Quinkana’s habitation to be terrestrial, but others argue that most specimens were discovered near known sources of water. An ongoing debate also persists about its dominance as a Pleistocene predator based upon the proportional quantity of predacious reptilian discoveries compared to predacious mammalian predators. The opposing side questions its predominance through findings that it coexisted with several other predators and prey.

 Species 
The species within Quinkana include: the type species Q. fortirostrum from the Pliocene and Pleistocene of Queensland, Q. babarra from the Early Pliocene of Queensland, Q. timara from the Middle Miocene of the Northern Territory, and Q. meboldi from the Late Oligocene of Queensland. There also remains a number of unattributed specimens.Quinkana fortirostrumQ. fortirostrum was discovered in the Chillagoe caves of Northern Queensland in 1970 by Lyndsey Hawkins, a member of the Sydney University Speleological Society. The partial skull was described as of "unusual form" (Australian Museum F.57844). It was notable because of its higher snout orientation compared to extant crocodiles and the alveoli suggestion of ziphodont or laterally compressed teeth. The combination of these characteristics had previously not been found in Australia. Preliminary comparisons were made with sebecosuchians, pristichampsines, and modern crocodylids. Using this specimen, Ralph Molnar described Quinkana as a genus in 1981. Its generic name was derived from Quinkan, which is a term for “spirit” from the Northern Queensland aboriginal Gugu-Yalanji people. Quinkans were represented by crocodiles in at least one instance at a southeastern Cape York rock painting location. Molnar also created the type species Q. fortirostrum, which was based on the Latin words fortis and rostrum meaning strong and beak (in reference to the species' snout).

The new genus was rationalised because of its distinctive maxilla (upper jawbone) and the proportions of its snout. Preliminary comparisons were made with sebecosuchians, pristichampsines, and modern crocodylids. The definition of Q. fortirostrum compared the maxilla to crocodilians and determined that the specimen exhibited substantial palatine (upper mouth bone) and alveoli (tooth sockets) differences to be considered a new genus. The palatine exhibited a shorter jugal (cheek) and deeper infraorbital bar (bone between eye socket and palate) than what was common in crocodiles. The alveoli were found to be elongated which indicated that Q. fortirostrum had ziphodont or laterally compressed teeth, which differs from the interlocking teeth of Crocodylidae. The speciation was supported with multiple Pleistocene examples of maxilla and teeth found throughout Queensland and northern New South Wales. Quinkana timaraA second species named Quinkana timara was described by paleontologist Dirk Megirian in 1994. The holotype (NTM P895-19 from the Northern Territory Museum) consisted of premaxilla (foremost upper jawbone), maxilla, and jugal fragments within limestone found in the Bullock Creek Locality in the Northern Territory. Additional referred specimens of maxilla fragments and teeth were found at the same site and were all determined to be from the middle to late Miocene. The collected specimens were compared with Q. fortirostrum and Pristichampsus species. Q. timara was attributed to Quinkana because it shared the same ziphodont teeth orientation and snout formation as Q. fortirostrum. The species was defined as having a “narrower snout” and “proportionally larger antorbital shelf [opening in the skull]” than Q. fortirostrum. This distinction is reflected in the name timara, which are thin Quinkans or “spirits" in Gugu-Yalanji mythology.

Quinkana babarra
The third species, Quinkana babarra, was named in 1996 by researcher Brian Mackness and paleontologist Paul M.A. Willis. The holotype (QM F23220 from the Queensland Museum) was a maxilla fragment uncovered in 1991 by Mackness at the Dick’s Mother Lode Quarry in the Charters Towers Region northeast Queensland. Other referred specimens including teeth were found in the same location and were estimated to be early Pliocene in age. Q. babarra was determined to have an abbreviated and wider shout compared to Q. foritrostrum and Q. timara. The new species also had a significant crest along its maxilla and premaxilla which was minimal in Q. timara and not present in Q. fortirostrum. The name is derived from the Gugu-Yalanji word babarr meaning “older sister” in reference to Q. fortirostrum.

Quinkana meboldi
	Three maxilla, two left (QM F31056 and QM F31057) and one right (QM F31058), and a partial dental specimen (QM F31059) were discovered by Willis in 1996. The specimens were found at the White Hunter Site in Riversleigh, northwestern Queensland which is a late Oligocene deposit. The species has a narrower snout than Q. fortirostrum and a low alveolar ridge. The species was named in 1997 for Ulrich Mebold, a German astronomer.

Unattributed specimens
The speciation of Q. fortirostrum mentions a specimen consisting of a partial maxilla including two teeth (QM F10771) found at the Glen Garland Station in Yarraden, northwestern Queensland. Although it exhibited alveolar similarities with Quinkana, the maxilla was determined to be divergent from Q. fortirostrum and was therefore not attributed to the species. QM F10771 was later found to be similar to Q. barbarra in alveoli formation, but the palate of the specimen was too incomplete and it was recommended to remain unattributed.

	A late Pleistocene tooth (QM F57032) was found in 2013 in the Kings Creek site of southeastern Queensland and attributed to Quinkana. It was most similar to fragmentary teeth from Q. foritrostrum, but was not attributed to any species because of a lack of complete specimens.

A metatarsal bone (QM F30566) was found in 1992 in the Bluff Downs Fossil Site near Allingham in north Queensland. It was thought to be Pliocene in age and was compared against Q. barbarra. It represents a rare limb element which could be from Quinkana, although no determination has been made of its species or genus.

Description 
The estimate is furthermore questioned because of a lack of complete Quinkana specimens.

The genus is the only known mekosuchinae with both a broad snout and ziphodont teeth. It can be distinguished primarily by its uniquely elongated and oriented alveoli (tooth sockets) combined with a wide but short snout and a short anterior palatine process (upper mouth bone). Quinkana also have a U-shaped snout with a distinct maxillary recess. Most species also share a similar pattern of crests along their snout, with dimensions varying by species. Quinkana has teeth which have serrations on some crowns but not on others. All of its teeth are mildly recurved similarly to extant crocodilians.

Taxonomy 
Quinkana is a genus within the subfamily Mekosuchinae. Other genera included in this family are Australosuchus, Baru, Kambara, Mekosuchus, Paludirex, and Trilophosuchus.

The type species Q. fortirostrum was originally classified under Crocodylidae in 1981 through comparison against other Crocodilia genera Pristichampsus, Paleosuchus, and Osteolaemus and against Sebecosuchia genus Sebecus. The most similarities were found with Pristichampsus and it was determined that the genus should fall under Crocodilia. However, its ziphodont teeth and broad snout made it an outlier in the order as no other genera shared those features. These discrepancies led to the attribution of Q. fortirostrum to Crocodylidae with the acknowledgement of this potential ambiguity.

The subfamily Mekosuchinae was proposed in 1993 by Molnar, Willis, and Professor John Scanlon to accurately define a growing number of Australian crocodilian genera. It was designed to accommodate Quinkana and other genera which demonstrated unique dentary characteristics and were native to Australasia during the Tertiary or Quaternary period. Quinkana remains an outlier because it is the only ziphodont genus within the subfamily. The Mekosuchinae classification was contrasted in the 1994 speciation of Q. timara suggesting that further research into the phylogeny of Pristichampsus and Quinkana was necessary because of significant “structural similarities” in the snout when compared to other Crocodylidae. However, this has not altered the accepted classification and Mekosuchinae is the dominant phylogenic subfamily used in academic or research contexts.

A 2018 tip dating study by Lee & Yates simultaneously using morphological, molecular (DNA sequencing), and stratigraphic (fossil age) data established the inter-relationships within Crocodylia. The cladogram below shows the placement of Quinkana within Mekosuchinae::

Paleobiology 
Quinkana was originally thought to be entirely terrestrial because many of the specimens had been found in caves and because other ziphodonts were known to be land-dwelling. Early analysis also discussed morphologic traits such as "hooflike unguals" and a rounder as opposed to flattened tail as indications of its terrestrial habitation. However, modern interpretations argued that it was semi-aquatic because all attributed specimens have been discovered in dig sites which were known to have been near bodies of water. The issue remains contested due to a lack of evidence.

It has been suggested that Quinkana’s ziphodont teeth indicated, “predation upon larger prey than is usual for crocodiles”. Studies have also speculated that the genus’ ziphodont teeth indicate that it was a cursorial hunter as opposed to the ambush techniques utilised by extant crocodilians. This finding is also correlated with analysis of the pectoral and pelvic girdles of other Mekosuchines which are theorised to be representative of Quinkana’s anatomy, as no complete specimens have been found.

It was proposed in 1981 that the species may have been a dominant predator because there were no other known terrestrial hunters in the Tertiary and Pleistocene periods. Modern analysis has furthermore suggested that there was a "taxonomic-ecological shift" in Australia after the Miocene, and beginning as early as the Pliocene, as the proportion of large predators shifted from mammalian to reptilian. This theory of dominant reptilian predators including Quinkana and Megalania during the Tertiary and Pleistocene is supported by some academics, although others argue that these genera were not actively predacious because there is evidence that many reptilians and mammals coexisted. One study found Quinkana teeth in a Pleistocene river deposit in South Walker Creek in Western Queensland amidst thirteen extinct and three extant genera, evenly split between carnivorous and herbivorous genera, with three genera of crocodilians, and suggested that this demonstrates a high level of coexistence.

Analysis has also suggested that there may be possibilities for two or more predacious crocodilians to coexist in a singular habitat with the provision that they have distinct head shapes. In theory, this is thought to be because the distinct snout morphologies indicate different types of hunting and use of habitats. This has been derived from modern analysis of extant species, but has generally correlated with other discoveries of overlapping carnivorous crocodilian deposits. One possible attributable Quinkana specimen presented evidence of a traumatic bite injury which would have occurred due to interspecies aggression. A study concluded that this was likely due to intraspecies aggression, but that it could also have been due to interspecies conflict.

The causes for the species’ extinction in southeastern Queensland is considered to be environmental. With the presumption of Quinkana as a semi-aquatic predator, it has been suggested that the deterioration of river habitats in Queensland since the Middle Pleistocene led to its extinction. This is due to changes occurring from the last glacial cycle which created more open grasslands and resulted in more droughts, which locally explains the extinction of water dependent species such as Quinkana. Studies have also suggested that extant crocodilians managed to survive by moving to coastal habitats, while Quinkana did not.

References 

Mekosuchinae
Oligocene crocodylomorphs
Miocene crocodylomorphs
Pliocene crocodylomorphs
Pleistocene crocodylomorphs
Pleistocene genus extinctions
Pleistocene reptiles of Australia
Crocodiles of Australia
Apex predators
Prehistoric pseudosuchian genera